Isabel Bishop (March 3, 1902 – February 19, 1988) was an American painter and graphic artist. Bishop studied under Kenneth Hayes Miller at the Art Students League of New York, where she would later become an instructor. She was most notable for her scenes of everyday life in Manhattan, as a member of the loosely-defined ‘Fourteenth Street School’ of artists, grouped in that precinct. Union Square features prominently in her work, which mainly depicts female figures. Bishop’s paintings won the American Academy of Arts and Letters Award, among other distinctions.

Early life and education
Bishop was born the youngest of five siblings in Cincinnati, Ohio. Founders of a prep school in Princeton, New Jersey, her parents were highly educated individuals and descendants from East coast mercantile families. Though the family descended from old wealth, their immediate status was of the middle class, and financial insecurity forced the family to move often. Bishop spent her childhood years in Detroit, Michigan. In every new city the Bishop family would move to, John, Isabel's father, would become involved with a local school. Oftentimes becoming the principal or eventually owning the school. Bishop compared growing up and moving around with her parents to be like being an only child, because her siblings were fifteen plus years older than her and didn't live with her family at the time.

Her father was a scholar of Greek and Latin. Her siblings, two sets of twins, were older than her by well over a decade. One set of twins, a boy and a girl, were twelve years older; the other set of twins, also a boy and girl, were fifteen years old at the time of her birth. Her mother was emotionally indifferent and distant from Bishop; she was a suffragist, feminist and aspiring writer who urged her daughters to become independent, strong women.  After the family relocated to Detroit, Bishop began her art education at the age of 12 in a Saturday morning life drawing class at the John Wicker Art School in Detroit.

In 1918, at the age of 15, Bishop graduated high school and began art studies at John Wicker's art school in Detroit, Michigan. She later moved to New York City to study illustration at the New York School of Applied Design for Women. After two years there she shifted from illustration to painting, and attended the Art Students League for four years until 1924. It was there that she studied with Guy Pène du Bois and with Kenneth Hayes Miller, from whom she adapted a technique which owed much to baroque Flemish painting. In addition, she learned from other early modernists including Max Weber and Robert Henri. During the early 1920s she also studied and painted in Woodstock, New York. In 1963, she went to Yale University School of Fine Arts, New Haven.

Bishop was described as an eager intellectual who was naturally inquisitive and independent in her ways. In this period, women were becoming very active in the arts community, yet were still taken for granted. Bishop pushed against this attitude toward women artists with her insistence on applying herself both academically and politically in the art realm. Throughout her educational ventures, she was fully funded by her father's cousin, James Bishop Ford, who aided her family in their time of need. Writing on this financial sponsorship, Isabel Bishop states that she viewed her gender as an advantage: "I was lucky. I think if I had been a man the relative who sponsored my whole studenthood might not have done so. Men are supposed to make their own way. Young women were supposed to marry. But a young woman putting so much time and effort—being so serious—that was different—that interested him. I don't think he would have subsidized me if I had been a boy."

Career
For the first time that she taught at The Art Students League in New York, she was the only full time woman teacher in that school.

Throughout the 1920s and 1930s she developed a realist style of painting, primarily depicting women in their daily routine on the streets of Manhattan. Her work was greatly influenced by Peter Paul Rubens and other Dutch and Flemish painters that she had discovered during trips to Europe. In 1932, Bishop began showing her work frequently at the newly opened Midtown Galleries, where her work would be represented throughout her career. Bishop takes inspiration from Rubens by adding a light ochre-ish tone to all her works, allowing for the painting to be rendered in any way.

In 1934, Bishop married Dr. Harold G. Wolff, a neurologist, and moved to Riverdale New York. However, she continued to work in a loft studio near Union Square at 9 West Fourteenth St, which she continued to use until 1984. She became interested in the interaction of form and ground and the mobility of everyday life, what she called "unfixity", life and movement captured on canvas. Her style is noted for its sensitive modeling of form and "a submarine pearliness and density of atmosphere". During this time, Bishop began working in various printing techniques, most notably aquatint.

Her work was included in the first three iterations of the Whitney Biennial in 1932, 1934, and 1936, as well as ten subsequent annual exhibitions at the Whitney Museum of American Art. She returned to the Art Students League as an instructor from 1936 to 1937. In 1940, Bishop was elected into the National Academy of Design as an associate member, and became a full member in 1941. Her work was also part of the painting event in the art competition at the 1932 Summer Olympics.  She was also a member of and frequently shown her work in the Society of American Graphic Artists exhibitions.

In 1938, she painted a post office mural, Great Men Came from the Hills, in New Lexington, Ohio, through the Section of Painting and Sculpture. According to the Ohio Historical Society, “In Isabel Bishop’s mural for New Lexington, historic personages from the town admire their achievements across the valley, where we see the forms and silhouettes of distant buildings. The artist, from New York City, discovered that the townspeople were proud of the distinguished people who came from Perry County. She included a Revolutionary soldier, a governor of Wisconsin, a founder of New Lexington and his grandson, an author of reference books on Ohio, the developer of the coal industry, a senator, a newspaperman, a naturalist, the county’s first historian, and General Sheridan.”

Bishop's mature works mainly depict the inhabitants of New York's Union Square area. Her portraits are often studies of individual heads (see Laughing Head, 1938, Butler Institute of American Art); the emphasis securely on the subject's expression – or of solitary nudes. Bishop also painted multiple-figure compositions, often containing two females engaged in various workday interactions. In the post-war years, Bishop's interest turned to more abstracted scenes of New Yorkers walking and traveling, in the streets or on the subways. Her signature changed many times over her career, ranging from the use of various pseudonyms to initials; some early pieces are signed I.B, or I. Bishop in both block and script. Her work remains significant as an example of the thematic concerns of the Fourteenth St. School, as well as her contribution to feminism and the "new woman" emerging in urban landscapes. The "Fourteenth Street School," was a loosely affiliated group named for the area around Union Square, where Bishop, Reginald Marsh, and the brothers Raphael Soyer and Moses Soyer worked.

In the mid-1940s, E. P. Dutton commissioned Bishop to illustrate a new edition of Jane Austen's novel Pride and Prejudice. Bishop produced 31 pen-and-ink drawings (the originals are now at the Pierpont Morgan Library).

The first retrospective exhibition of Bishop's work was held during her lifetime at the University of Arizona Museum of Art in 1974.

Awards 
In 1943, Bishop was awarded the American Academy of Arts and Letters Award.

In 1979, President Jimmy Carter presented her with the Outstanding Achievement in the Arts Award.

In 1987, she received a Gold Medal for Painting by the American Academy of Arts and Letters.

Notable works
Virgil and Dante in Union Square, 1932, Oil on canvas, Delaware Art Museum  

This piece hung in Bishop's Riverdale home for more than seven years, and set the leitmotif of her career. As a child, Bishop became familiar with the story of Virgil and Dante through her mother, who was translating the text from Italian. Dante's journey through heaven and hell represented the extraordinary depth to life and its many experiences. The two figures standing in front of Union Square adds a narrative element to the bustling scene of life in a city of millions, and sets the scene for her various paintings and prints of urban life.Two Girls, 1935, Oil and tempera on Masonite, Metropolitan Museum of Art One of Bishop's most well-known works, the painting took more than a year to complete and was shown at the Midtown Galleries. For the piece, Bishop had two acquaintances from the Union Square area pose, wanting to capture the interaction of the two figures. The piece was painted with oil and tempera.Encounter, 1940, Oil and tempera on Masonite, St Louis Art Museum In Encounter, Bishop continues with her multiple-figure compositions capturing a scene of interaction between a man and a woman on a city street. Her depiction of the woman as forthright and confident, approaching the man and backing him against a wall, exemplifies Bishop's understanding of shifting gender roles at the time.Tidying Up, 1941, Oil on Masonite, Indianapolis Museum of Art 'Tidying Up depicts a young female office worker in the midst of checking her teeth in a compact mirror. The ungainly image of self-inspection accords with Bishop's realism and her interest in the daily lives of working women. The rough brushstrokes and surface texture exhibit an interest in old master paintings.

 Exhibitions 
 Isabel Bishop: exhibition of paintings and drawings, Jan. 17-Feb. 4.  New York: Midtown Galleries, 1939.
 Isabel Bishop: February 11-February 29.  New York: Midtown Galleries, [1940?]
 Bishop. May 3–May 21, 1949. New York: Midtown Galleries, 1949.
 Bishop, Paintings and Drawings, Oct. 25-Nov. 19, 1955.  New York: Midtown Galleries, [1955]
 Isabel Bishop. March 7-March 30, 1960. New York City: Midtown Galleries, 1960.
 Isabel Bishop. May 3–May 28, 1960. Midtown Galleries, 1960
 Isabel Bishop. April 4–29, 1967. New York: Midtown Galleries, 1967.
 Paintings by Isabel Bishop. Sculpture by Dorothea Greenbaum. [Exhibition] May 2–July 5, 1970. Trenton: New Jersey State Museum, 1970.
 Isabel Bishop: A Selection of Drawings and Prints. January 8–February 2, 1974. New York: Midtown Galleries, 1974.
 Isabel Bishop. Tucson: University of Arizona Museum of Art, 1974.
 The Lydia and Warren Chappell Collection of Drawings and Prints by Isabel Bishop. April 12–May 18, 1975. Charlottesville: University of Virginia Art Museum, 1975.
 Isabel Bishop, Drawings and Etchings. December 5–30, 1978. New York: Midtown Galleries, 1978.
 Isabel Bishop Exhibition—A Fifty Year Drawing Retrospective and Recent Paintings. October 6–31, 1981. New York: Midtown Galleries, 1981.
 Isabel Bishop, An Intimate Exhibition: Work of the Past Five Years. February 1–26, 1983. New York: Midtown Galleries, 1983.
 Isabel Bishop: Drawings - Paintings. January 8–February 2, 1985. New York: Midtown Galleries, 1985.
 Isabel Bishop: Across Five Decades - The Affectionate Eye - March, 1985.
 Isabel Bishop: Etchings and Aquatints, 1985.
 Isabel Bishop: A Retrospective of Prints and Drawings. November 5–26, 1985. Associated American Artists, 1985.
 Isabel Bishop: Early Drawings. December 9, 1986 – January 17, 1987. New York: Midtown Galleries, 1986.
 Isabel Bishop. May 16–30, 1991. Beverly Hills: Louis Newman Galleries, 1991.
 Isabel Bishop: Walking Pictures. October 13–November 14, 1992. New York: Midtown Payson Galleries, 1992.
 Isabel Bishop: Drawings. April 7–May 2, 1998. New York: DC Moore Gallery, 1998.
 Isabel Bishop, 1902–1988: A Selection of Paintings, Drawings, and Prints. September 5–October 5, 2013. New York: DC Moore Gallery, 2013.
 Women's Work: Selections from the Sordoni Art Gallery Permanent Collection. June 5–July 27, 2014. Wilkes-Barre: Sordoni Art Gallery, Wilkes University, 2014.

 Bibliography 

Books
 Brooklyn Museum. Isabel Bishop--Prints and Drawings, 1925–1964. Brooklyn: The Museum, 1964.
 Ellett, Mary Sweeney. “Isabel Bishop—The Endless Search.” Ph.D diss. University of Virginia, 1987.
 Lunde, Karl. Isabel Bishop. New York: Abrams, 1975.
 Nemser, Cindy. Art Talk: Conversations with 15 Women Artists. New York: IconEditions, 1995. Pages 303–320.
 Teller, Susan. Isabel Bishop—Etchings and Aquatints: a catalogue raisonné. 2nd ed. New York: Associated American Artists, 1985.
 Todd, Ellen Wiley. The "New Woman" Revised: Painting and Gender Politics on Fourteenth Street. Berkeley: University of California Press, 1993. Chapter 7, pages 55–62.
 Yglesias, Helen. Isabel Bishop. New York: Rizzoli, 1989.

 Articles 
 Ellett, Mary S. “Isabel Bishop: The Endless Search.” Southeastern College Art Conference Review 11,no. 2 (Spring 1987): 165–166.
 Rubinstein, Charlotte Streifer, "American Scene and Realist Painting: Isabel Bishop."  American Women Artists: From Early Indian Times to the Present. Boston: G.K. Jall & Co., 1982
 Todd, Ellen Wiley. “Isabel Bishop—Our Modern Master?” Woman's Art Journal 13 (Spring/Summer 1992): 45–47.
 Wooden, Howard. "Art Feature: Isabel Bishop's Self-Portrait. Wichita Art Museum News (April 1988).
 Yglesias, Helen. “Isabel Bishop: Paintings, Drawings, Prints.” Massachusetts Review 24 (Summer 1983): 289–304.

See also
 Young Woman Notes 
 The Isabel Bishop Papers, 1914-1983 have been digitized and posted online by the Archives of American Art, Smithsonian Institution. These primary source historical documents include biographical documents, correspondence, writings and notes, exhibition catalogs, photographs of Bishop with her husband and in her studio, original artwork including 8 sketchbooks, loose sketches, prints, and watercolor figure studies.
 The American indie rock band Unrest released an EP named the Isabel Bishop E.P. in 1993, with Bishop's picture on the cover.
 One of Bishop's illustrations for Pride and Prejudice—of Elizabeth Bennet reading a letter from Jane—will be prominently featured on the £10 note honoring Jane Austen. The note will be in circulation in 2016.

References
Messinger, L. M. (1996). Isabel Bishop: Self-portrait. Metropolitan Museum of Art Bulletin, 54'', 58–58.

Todd, Ellen Wiley. (1989). Isabel Bishop: the question of difference. Smithsonian studies in American art Vol. 3, issue 4 (fall 1989), p. 24-41

Yglesias, Helen. (1975). Isabel Bishop.

Footnotes

External links
 Oral history interview with Isabel Bishop, 1959 May 29, Archives of American Art, Smithsonian Institution
 , Oral history interview with Isabel Bishop, 1987 November 12-December 11], Archives of American Art, Smithsonian Institution

1902 births
1988 deaths
20th-century American painters
Social realist artists
American women painters
American muralists
New York School of Applied Design for Women alumni
Section of Painting and Sculpture artists
Artists from Cincinnati
Artists from Detroit
American tempera painters
Painters from New York City
American women printmakers
Painters from Ohio
Painters from Michigan
National Academy of Design members
20th-century American women artists
Women muralists
20th-century American printmakers
Art Students League of New York alumni
Olympic competitors in art competitions
Members of the American Academy of Arts and Letters